Keliko (Kaliko) is a Central Sudanic language of the Democratic Republic of the Congo and South Sudan.

Omi was once considered a dialect.

Locations
A 2013 survey reported that ethnic Keliko reside in the following bomas of Morobo County, South Sudan. (Morobo County was reported to have a majority of ethnic Kakwa people.)

Alutu Boma (Wudabi Payam)
Nyei Boma (Wudabi Payam)
Yugufe Boma (Lujule Payam)
Kendre Boma (Lujule Payam)
Kembe Boma (Lujule Payam)

Ethnic Keliko are also found in Yei County, in Asole Boma (Lasu Payam).

References

Moru-Madi languages
Languages of the Democratic Republic of the Congo
mk:Омиски јазик